Richard Franklin Boulware II (born October 12, 1968) is a United States district judge of the United States District Court for the District of Nevada and former assistant Federal Public Defender.

Biography

Boulware received an Artium Baccalaureus degree, cum laude, in 1993 from Harvard College and studied toward a Doctor of Philosophy in Sociology from 1995–1998. He received a Juris Doctor in 2002 from Columbia Law School.

From 2002 to 2003, he served as a law clerk to Judge Denise Cote of the United States District Court for the Southern District of New York. From 2003 to 2007, he was a trial attorney in the Federal Public Defender's Office in New York City. He has served in the Federal Public Defender's Office in Las Vegas, Nevada since 2007, serving as the lead attorney for complex white-collar cases since 2010.

Federal judicial service

On January 16, 2014, President Barack Obama nominated Boulware to serve as a District Judge of the United States District Court for the District of Nevada to the seat vacated by Judge Philip Martin Pro, who assumed senior status on December 31, 2011. He received a hearing before the United States Senate Committee on the Judiciary on March 12, 2014. On April 3, 2014, his nomination was reported out of committee by a 11–7 vote. 

On June 5, 2014, Senate Majority Leader Harry Reid filed for cloture on the nomination. On June 9, 2014, the United States Senate invoked cloture by a 53–34 vote. On June 10, 2014, the Senate confirmed his nomination by a 58–35 vote. He received his judicial commission the same day. He was sworn in on June 12, 2014.

In 2015, Boulware began hearing a high profile anti-trust lawsuit against the Ultimate Fighting Championship filed by several of its former fighters.  The fighters allege that the UFC  "unlawfully monopolized the market for mixed martial arts promotion by, among other things, locking up fighters with exclusive contracts and acquiring its rivals, leading to suppressed compensation for the fighters". The UFC is fighting the suit, alleging that it is "meritless." In September of 2020, Boulware indicated he was "likely" to grant class-action status to the suit.

Nomination to United States Sentencing Commission
On September 9, 2015, President Obama nominated Boulware to a position on the United States Sentencing Commission. He would have replaced former Commissioner Ketanji Brown Jackson and his term would have expired October 31, 2019. His nomination expired at the end of the 114th Congress.

See also 
 List of African-American federal judges
 List of African-American jurists

References

External links

1968 births
Living people
21st-century American judges
African-American judges
Columbia Law School alumni
Harvard College alumni
Judges of the United States District Court for the District of Nevada
New York (state) lawyers
Nevada lawyers
People from Rochester, Minnesota
Public defenders
United States district court judges appointed by Barack Obama